The women's 100 metres hurdles at the 2022 World Athletics Championships was held at the Hayward Field in Eugene on 23 and 24 July 2022. It was won by Tobi Amusan. Amusan set a world record of 12.12 seconds in the semi-final. She ran 12.06 to win the final, but that was not a world record because it was wind assisted.

Summary

This was a dramatic event from the first heat to the final.  In heat 1, defending champion Nia Ali was out in front early, with three to automatically qualify, Britany Anderson come up to challenge her over the last few hurdles. Ali clipped the ninth hurdle, started to lose her balance at full speed. She tried valiantly to jump over the final hurdle, but her lead leg never could get high enough, instead hooking the hurdle in the lane next to her, belonging to Anne Zagré.  Ali was down on the track as the entire field ran past her.

After the disqualification, notably of Devon Allen earlier in the week, athletes commented on how they were being extra careful about their starting technique. Olympic Champion Jasmine Camacho-Quinn and world record holder Kendra Harrison had to battle back from slow starts to win their heats. Tobi Amusan took a hundredth off her African Record to be the fastest qualifier.  In heat 4, Alaysha Johnson missed her step to the first hurdle, then pushed the second hurdle over to be disqualified. On the sixth hurdle Liz Clay tripped and rolled into the seventh hurdle. And after a protest, a seventh heat was created by disqualifying Ali for interfering with another athlete's hurdle, to allow Zagré a solo attempt to make a qualifying time.  In that special heat, Zagré fell over the tenth hurdle and failed.

The first semi final saw Amusan make another improvement. With Harrison two lanes to her right, Amusan was out fast and kept pulling away. After crossing the line she looked up at the scoreboard, first happiness at winning the race, then surprise, then joy. Her time was 12.12, a new world record and the wind was legal +0.9.  This distance was first introduced to major championship level in the 1972 Olympics. During the 1970's, when drug testing was less sophisticated and automatic timing was not required (until 1977), Grażyna Rabsztyn and other primarily Soviet bloc athletes took the world record from the first auto timed 12.48 down to 12.36 by 1980.  Between 1986 and 1988,, two Bulgarian athletes Ginka Zagorcheva and Yordanka Donkova inched the record down from 12.29 to Donkova's 12.21 which remained unchanged for almost 28 years until Harrison took 1/100th off. That too stood for another 6 years. In one day, Amusan improved the world record by 8 times the progress of 36 years and her personal best by almost a third of a second. 

And the semi-finals were not over. Anderson ran 12.31 for a new national record and the #9 individual in history. Three others also set their national records and the entire top 16 set seasons bests, most of them personal bests. And the final was less than 2 hours later.

Amusan got out well in the final, but Anderson was next to her running the exact same cadence, with Alia Armstrong and Harrison inches behind. By the fourth hurdle, Amusan began to edge ahead while Harrison was going the other direction. Danielle Williams was gaining on Anderson. Within two hurdles, Amusan had daylight in front, Anderson, Armstrong, Williams and now Camacho-Quinn were dead even. Harrison hit the seventh hurdle, pushing over the eighth to be disqualified, Anderson and Camacho-Quinn separated from the lineup and Amusan was a metre and a half clear. They closed in on the line, Amusan raised her hands in victory after crossing the line, Anderson and Camacho-Quinn in a photo finish. Look at the time, 12.06 but no, the wind reading was +2.5 MPS, over the allowable so there would be no new world record. It was just the fastest time ever run. From the photo, Anderson was given silver by .005.

Records
Before the competition records were as follows:

Qualification standard
The standard to qualify automatically for entry was 12.84.

Schedule
The event schedule, in local time (UTC−7), was as follows:

Results

Heats 
The first 3 athletes in each heat (Q) and the next 6 fastest (q) qualify to the semi-finals..

Wind:Heat 1: -0.3 m/s, Heat 2: -0.4 m/s, Heat 3: +1.5 m/s, Heat 4: +0.7 m/s, Heat 5: +0.5 m/s, Heat 6: -0.4 m/s, Heat 7: -0.1 m/s

Semi-finals 
The first 2 athletes in each heat (Q) and the next 2 fastest (q) qualified to the final.

Wind:Heat 1: +0.9 m/s, Heat 2: -0.1 m/s, Heat 3: +0.3 m/s

Final 
The final was started on 24 July at 19:01. The wind speed of +2.5 m/s was outside of the allowable range for the world record.

References

100 hurdles
Sprint hurdles at the World Athletics Championships